The Trinity Alps are a mountain range in Trinity County and Siskiyou County in Northern California. They are a subrange of the Klamath Mountains located to the north of Weaverville.

Geography
The Trinity Alps are within the Pacific Coast Ranges physiographic region, in the Klamath Mountains System, which lies between the California Coast Ranges to the west and the Cascade Range to the east. Other notable peaks include Granite Peak and Ycatapom Peak. The Trinity Alps are noted for their scenic views and alpine environment. The range's alpine flora differs from that found in the Sierra Nevada or the Cascades. Within the Klamath Mountains, adjacent subranges of the Trinity Alps include the Salmon Mountains and Scott Mountains.

The area was formerly known as the Salmon-Trinity Alps Primitive Area since 1932 until a series of expansions.

Glaciers, snowfields, and ice fields

The only unambiguous glacier is the Grizzly Glacier, a  icefield on the north side of Thompson Peak, which shows crevasses indicating true motion even on so small an icefield.

Research has shown that some glaciers in the Trinity Alps are more resistant to the effects of global warming than are other California glaciers. According to recent, but incorrect, USGS maps, 35 permanent bodies of snow and several tiny glaciers dot the highest peaks of the Alps.

Temporary glacier
On the ridge south of Sapphire Lake is an unusual phenomenon consisting of a temporary glacier, versus an inactive snowfield that melts out in dry years.  Following years of heavy accumulation, an icefield appears in this fully sheltered north-facing cirque that can show active crevasses and seracs some tens of feet high.  But this ice body, at an elevation of only  in a region experiencing a long, hot dry season from about mid May to mid October, can disappear completely during a run of drier years.

Studies of lichen collars indicate that the site near Kalmia Lake is the snowiest spot in the State of California, receiving snow accumulation in excess of the Lake Helen snowcourse on Lassen Peak, by far the snowcourse with greatest late winter snow accumulation in California. Sufficient snow does accumulate under Brokeoff that in some years the snowfield there experiences incipient glacial motion. Two moraines below it, one very recent, provide clear evidence at least of mass transport in the recent past at that site. These moraines are quite a bit smaller than those found below the Thompson Peak glacieret.

Natural history

Flora

The Trinity Alps section of the Klamath Mountains Ecoregion is botanically outstanding by having the second greatest number of conifer species of any place in the world.  Russian Peak, in the Russian Wilderness just north of the Trinity Alps, has the greatest number of conifer species in North America. So many genera and species of conifers exist together because the Trinity Alps are at the intersection of the Mediterranean climate of the south and the Northwestern coastal climate, which has a shorter dry season.

Northern tree species, such as subalpine fir (Abies lasiocarpa), Pacific silver fir (Abies amabilis), and Engelmann spruce (Picea engelmannii) are found here, as well as southern trees, such as incense cedar (Calocedrus decurrens), ponderosa pine (Pinus ponderosa), and white fir (Abies concolor), plus unique populations of foxtail pine (Pinus balfouriana) and weeping spruce (Picea breweriana).

Other plants along the trails include the carnivorous California pitcher plant (Darlingtonia californica), the showy pinkish Lewisia cotyledon, and the rare Trinity Alps endemic wildflower Trinity penstemon (Penstemon tracyi). Sagebrush is found on ridges in the Scott Mountains.

Large fires have burned through some of the forests in the wilderness, including much of the  Iron/Alps Complex fire in 2008.

Fauna
Most of the lakes have been stocked with rainbow, brown or brook trout, and some have self-sustaining populations.  The major streams of the North Fork Trinity River and New River watersheds have spawning chinook salmon, and some have steelhead.

The Trinity Alps are home to much wildlife, including: American black bear, mountain lion, bobcat, blacktailed deer, lizards, chipmunks, and a great number of bird species.  Deer and black bear are commonly seen.  Less common but present are mountain lion, pine marten, fisher, and wolverine. Rough-skinned newts are commonly found in ponds and lakes. The Trinity Alps may be home to a cryptozoological phenomenon, the Trinity Alps Giant Salamander.

Geology
Geologically, the Trinity Alps consist of a mixture of igneous, granite and metamorphic peaks. In the eastern mountains are the Red Trinities, due to reddish ultramafic peridotite, in the central granitic batholith are the White Trinities, and in the western mountains are the Green Trinities due to more extensive forest cover.  The region contains much pine and fir forest as well as meadows, creeks, and lakes.

Recreation

The US Forest Service, Shasta-Trinity National Forest, manages most of the Trinity Alps Wilderness. The northern boundary extends into the Klamath National Forest, and the western boundary extends into the Six Rivers National Forest.  There are also private inholdings, especially in the eastern portions.  The wilderness contains hiking trails, backcountry camping, and scenery.  Access is off California State Route 299 on the south, CA Route 3 on the east, and various old logging and mining roads on the north and west.  Wilderness permits are required for hiking.  The Pacific Crest Trail connects the northeast corner of the Trinity Alps to the Russian Wilderness and Marble Mountain Wilderness to the north and the Castle Crags Wilderness in the Trinity Divide to the east.

Less-visited areas include New River, Salmon Mountain, Horse Linto Creek, Pony Buttes, and Limestone Ridge in the west, and Packers Peak, Deadman Peak, and Eagle Peak in the Scott Mountains.  Most of the area is visited much less heavily than many other wilderness areas in California, such as in the High Sierra of Yosemite National Park and Kings Canyon National Park, but more heavily than the nearby Yolla Bolly-Middle Eel Wilderness.

The most popular destinations beyond the trailheads are Canyon Creek Lakes, Emerald and Sapphire Lakes on the Stuart Fork, and Granite Lake on the Swift Creek trail.  The western ridges are mostly lower in elevation with fewer lakes, and ridgetop trails there can be hot and dry in the summer.  Trails do not reach all of the lakes; cross-country routes are possible.

The Trinity Alps overlook Trinity Lake to the east, a large reservoir of the federal Central Valley Project on the Trinity River.    Hunting occurs for deer, bear, and bandtailed pigeon in season. Rock climbing is excellent in the areas with granite cliffs, such as Caribou Peak and Sawtooth Ridge.

See also
Klamath Mountains Ecoregion
Flora of the Klamath Mountains

References

External links 

 US Shasta-Trinity National Forest: official Shasta-Trinity Wilderness website
 Trinity Alps 30th Anniversary Facebook page

Klamath Mountains
Mountain ranges of Siskiyou County, California
Mountain ranges of Trinity County, California
Shasta-Trinity National Forest
California Coast Ranges
Mountain ranges of Northern California